Dactolisib (codenamed NVP-BEZ235 and BEZ-235, also known as  RTB101) is an imidazoquinoline derivative acting as a PI3K inhibitor. It also inhibits mTOR. It is being investigated as a possible cancer treatment.

It has been shown to be toxic to Waldenström's macroglobulinemia cells.

It was the first PI3K inhibitor to enter clinical trials, in 2006.

A phase IB/II clinical trial for locally advanced or metastatic HER2 negative breast cancer has completed.

A phase II clinical trial for advanced pancreatic neuroendocrine tumors (pNET) had initially reported results, but was later terminated because insufficient normal tissue tolerance to the drug.
A phase I clinical trial of BEZ235 in patients with advanced renal cell carcinoma had to be terminated prematurely due to toxicity and a lack of clinical efficacy .
Another Phase Ib study on patients with various solid cancers found severe normal tissue toxicity as well when BEZ235/Dactolisib was administered in combination with the mTOR inhibitor Everolimus. The authors concluded that the combination of both drugs demonstrated limited efficacy and tolerance. BEZ235 systemic exposure increased in a dose-proportional manner while oral bioavailability was quite low, which may be related to gastrointestinal-specific toxicity .
A phase I study of BEZ-235 to treat acute lymphoid leukaemia was initiated in 2012, but no results were published since then.

A phase 2a randomized, placebo-controlled clinical trial published in 2018 showed that everolimus in combination with dactolisib decreased the rate of reported infections in an elderly population.

References

Experimental cancer drugs
Imidazoquinolines
Phosphoinositide 3-kinase inhibitors
Quinolines